NGC 1262 is a barred spiral galaxy located in the constellation Eridanus.  NGC 1262 is the most distant object in the New General Catalogue lying about 1.5 billion light-years away from Earth. NGC 1262 is also a large galaxy with a diameter of about 380,000 light-years making it nearly four times larger than the Milky Way. It was discovered by astronomer Francis Leavenworth on November 12, 1885.

Supernova AT 2014fx in NGC 1262 was discovered by citizen scientists using the Galaxy Zoo website. Its coordinates (decimal) are: ra=48.893766 dec=-15.884613.

See also
 List of the most distant astronomical objects
 List of NGC objects (1001–2000)
 NGC 5609

References

External links
 
 

Eridanus (constellation)
Barred spiral galaxies
1262
12107
Astronomical objects discovered in 1885
Discoveries by Francis Leavenworth